Stephen John Warren is a Professor of astronomy at Imperial College London.

Education 
Warren studied civil engineering, with a strong emphasis on geotechnics, at the University of Cambridge, gaining a First in 1978. He returned to complete a doctorate at the Institute of Astronomy, Cambridge, which he finished in 1988.

Career and research 
Warren joined Imperial College London as a professor in 1994. He has since held a European Southern Observatory (ESO) fellowship and a Royal Society University Research Fellowship.

Warren holds a particular expertise in the field of quasars. Since 2001, he has been greatly involved in the UKIRT Infrared Deep Sky Survey. He was the leader of the team responsible for the discovery of the most distant quasar found, ULAS J1120+0641.

Warren has published over 70 papers in the field of astrophysics since 1987, featuring in journals such as Nature.

Awards and honours
Warren was awarded a Royal Society University Research Fellowship at the University of Oxford.

References

21st-century British astronomers
Academics of Imperial College London
Year of birth missing (living people)
Living people
Alumni of the University of Cambridge
20th-century British astronomers